The Enugu East Senatorial District in Enugu State of Nigeriacovers five local government areas of Enugu North, Enugu South, Isi Uzo, Nkanu East and Nkanu West.

The collation centre of Enugu East Senatorial District is in Agbani, Nkanu West LGA.  Chimaroke Nnamani of the People's Democratic Party is the current representative of Enugu North Senatorial District.

List of senators representing Enugu East

References 

Enugu State
Senatorial districts in Nigeria